Ljiljana Gardijan (born 28 December 1988) is a Serbian footballer who plays as a goalkeeper for Women's Super League club ŽFK Sloga Zemun and the Serbia women's national team.

Club career
Gardijan has played for ŽFK Spartak Subotica in Serbia, for ŽNK Pomurje in Slovenia and for KFF Vllaznia Shkodër in Albania.

International career
Gardijan capped for Serbia at senior level during the 2011 FIFA Women's World Cup qualification.

References

External links

1988 births
Living people
Serbian women's footballers
Women's association football goalkeepers
ŽFK Spartak Subotica players
ŽNK Mura players
KFF Vllaznia Shkodër players
ŽFK Sloga Zemun players
Serbia women's international footballers
Serbian expatriate women's footballers
Serbian expatriate sportspeople in Slovenia
Expatriate women's footballers in Slovenia
Serbian expatriate sportspeople in Albania
Expatriate footballers in Albania